Marchef w butonierce – Pidżama Porno's seventh album, released 23 April 2001 by S.P. Records.

Track listing

Videos
"Twoja Generacja"
"Tom Petty spotyka Debbie Harry"
"Bon Ton na Ostrzu Noża"

The band
Krzysztof "Grabaż" Grabowski – vocal
Andrzej "Kozak" Kozakiewicz – guitar, vocal
Sławek "Dziadek" Mizerkiewicz – guitar
Rafał "Kuzyn" Piotrowiak – drums
Julian "Julo" Piotrowiak – bass guitar

and also:
Łoś – sax and chords
Semen – sax
Szkodnik – trumpet
Piotr Korzeniowski – trumpet
Sławomir Janowski – keyboard
Arkadiusz Rejda – accordion
Agnieszka Gładyszak – violin
Bartosz Liczbański – mandoline

References
http://pidzamaporno.art.pl/?p=plyta&id=10
http://www.rockmetal.pl/recenzje/pidzama.porno-marchef.w.butonierce.html
https://web.archive.org/web/20110723120614/http://www.terazrock.pl/cd.php?CdId=258

Pidżama Porno albums
2001 albums